Andruw "Druw" Nicholas Jones (born November 28, 2003) is an American professional baseball outfielder. He was drafted second overall by the Arizona Diamondbacks in the 2022 MLB draft.

Amateur career
As a child, Jones would practice hitting tee balls off of water bottles. He subsequently played golf, but found that summers in Atlanta were too hot for the sport and quit. Jones played organized baseball on travel teams, but elected to focus on basketball during the school year as a student of Wesleyan School in Peachtree Corners, Georgia. He played basketball until partway through his ninth grade year, when he asked to try out for the baseball team. As a junior in 2021, he was the Gwinnett Daily Post Baseball Player of the Year after hitting .445 with 16 home runs and 39 runs batted in (RBIs). Jones finished his senior year in 2022 with a .570 batting average, 13 home runs, 39 RBIs, 72 runs, 33 walks, and 32 stolen bases. He committed to Vanderbilt University to play college baseball.

Professional career
Considered one of the top prospects for the 2022 Major League Baseball draft, the Arizona Diamondbacks selected Jones with the second overall selection. Jones signed with the Diamondbacks, receiving a reported signing bonus of $8,185,100. On July 26, 2022, it was revealed that Jones suffered a left shoulder injury while taking his first batting practice with the organization. He underwent surgery on August 3 to repair the posterior labrum in the shoulder.

Personal life
Jones is the son of former MLB outfielder Andruw Jones and Nicole Jones.

References

External links

2003 births
Living people
Baseball players from Atlanta
Baseball outfielders
American people of Curaçao descent